The 2022–2023 mpox outbreak in Belgium is part of the larger outbreak of human mpox caused by the West African clade of the monkeypox virus. Belgium was the fifth country, outside of the African countries with endemic mpox, to experience an outbreak in 2022. The first case was documented in Antwerp, Belgium, on May 19, 2022. As of August 10th, Belgium has 546 cases and 1 suspected case.

Background 

An ongoing outbreak of mpox was confirmed on May 6, 2022, beginning with a British resident who, after travelling to Nigeria (where the disease is endemic), presented symptoms consistent with mpox on April 29, 2022. The resident returned to the United Kingdom on May 4, creating the country's index case of the outbreak. The origin of several of the cases of mpox in the United Kingdom is unknown. Some monitors saw community transmission taking place in the London area as of mid-May, but it has been suggested that cases were already spreading in Europe in the previous months.

Transmission 

A large portion of those infected were believed to have not recently traveled to areas of Africa where mpox is normally found, such as Nigeria, the Democratic Republic of the Congo as well as central and western Africa. It is believed to be transmitted by close contact with sick people, with extra caution for those individuals with lesions on their skin or genitals, along with their bedding and clothing. The CDC has also stated that individuals should avoid contact and consumption of dead animals such as rats, squirrels, monkeys and apes along with wild game or lotions derived from animals in Africa.

In addition to more common symptoms, such as fever, headache, swollen lymph nodes, and rashes or lesions, some patients have also experienced proctitis, an inflammation of the rectum lining. CDC has also warned clinicians to not rule out mpox in patients with sexually transmitted infections since there have been reports of co-infections with syphilis, gonorrhea, chlamydia, and herpes.

History 

The first two known cases were detected in on May 19, 2022. The first infected person was diagnosed in Antwerp, and the second from a region called Flemish Brabant. Both had gone to the same party, and thus began the mpox outbreak in Belgium.It is unknown what hospital they went to, although it is very likely that the first infected person went to an Antwerp hospital, and the second infected person went to a Flemish Brabant region hospital. There, they both tested positive for mpox, becoming the first cases in Belgium.

A day after both tested positive, there was another case reported in a man of unknown age who was relatively healthy but had bullous lesions on his hands. More and more cases were reported in Belgium days later and more continue to be reported. As of August 10th, there are 546 cases and 1 suspected case.

Vaccination response 
On July 5th, the Office of European Commissioner for Health, Stella Kyriakides, told Belga News Agency that 3,040 mpox vaccines were shipped to Belgium on July 7th. According to the Cypriot commissioner, these deliveries will "protect Belgian citizens and respond to this outbreak." She also praised the European Health Emergency Response and Preparedness Authority's (HERA) quick response. Kyriakides concluded that more doses will be delivered to Belgium in the following weeks.

Responses and reactions
Hospitals have also begun making their own preparations to help control the current mpox outbreak, including screening patients, increasing decontamination and cleaning procedures, and wearing appropriate safety gear (Personal protective equipment / Medical gown) when interacting with infected patients.

Belgium also introduced a mandatory 21-day quarantine for infected mpox patients in hopes of containing the disease in the country. Close contacts are not required to self-isolate but are encouraged to remain vigilant, especially if in contact with vulnerable people.

See also

2022–2023 mpox outbreak
2022–2023 mpox outbreak in Europe
2022–2023 mpox outbreak in France
2022–2023 mpox outbreak in Germany
2022–2023 mpox outbreak in Italy
2022–2023 mpox outbreak in the Netherlands
2022–2023 mpox outbreak in Portugal
2022–2023 mpox outbreak in Spain
2022–2023 mpox outbreak in Switzerland
2022–2023 mpox outbreak in the United Kingdom
Monkeypox virus
Timeline of the 2022–2023 mpox outbreak
Smallpox vaccine

Notes

References

Belgium
Mpox
2022 in Belgium
2022 disasters in Belgium